Salman or Salmaan (Arabic: سَلْمان salmān), also spelt Selman, is an Arabic male given name meaning "obedient, disciplined, humble, loyal, devoted, faithful, observant, sincere, truthful", "submissive, yielding, compliant", "pure, genuine, taintless, clear, exempt (free) from every imperfection, faultiness, shortcoming, defect, deficiency", "perfect, intact, complete, solid, whole" and "valid, right, safe, secure, flawless, proper, self-controlled (-restrained), unspoiled, true".

The name Salman (سَلْمان salmān) has a diminutive called Sulayman, which both names stems from the male noun-name Salaam.

Given name 
Salman the Persian, one of Muhammad's companions
Salman of Saudi Arabia, King of Saudi Arabia
Salman, Crown Prince of Bahrain
 Salman Abedi, terrorist responsible for the Manchester Arena bombing in 2017
Salman Ahmad, Pakistani pop artist and member of the band Junoon
Selman Akbulut, Turkish mathematician
Salman Ali, Indian singer 
Salman Butt, Pakistani cricketer
Salman Al-Farij, Saudi Arabian footballer
Salman Irshad, Pakistani cricketer 
Salman Khan, Indian Politician
Salman Khan, educator
Salman Khan, Indian film actor
Salman Khurshid, Indian politician
Salmaan King, South African footballer
Salman Mazahiri (1946–2020), Indian Muslim scholar
Salman Raduyev, Chechen separatist warlord 
Selman Reis, Ottoman admiral
Salman Rushdie, British-Indian novelist
Salman bin Sultan Al Saud, Saudi royal and politician
Salman Shahid, Pakistani actor
Selman Stërmasi, Albanian footballer
Salmaan Taseer (1944–2011), Pakistani businessman and politician
Salman Yusuff Khan, Indian dancer and actor

Surname
Ali Salman, Bahraini Twelver Shi'a cleric and Secretary-General of the Al-Wefaq political society
Bart Selman, professor of computer science at Cornell University
David Salman (1936–2010), American legislator known for sponsoring the first bill for use of medical marijuana in New Mexico
Dulquer Salmaan (born 1986), Indian Malayalam film actor and playback singer active from 2012
Hussain Salman, Bahraini footballer
İlyas Salman, Turkish actor, film director, author, screenwriter and musician
John Selman (disambiguation)
Karim Salman (1965–2020), Iraqi footballer
Saad Salman, Iraqi-French film director
Marcus Sahlman, Swedish footballer
Peyman Salmani, Iranian footballer

See also
Arabic name
Salmon (given name)
Salmon (surname)
Solomon (name)
Salomon (surname)
Zalman (name)

Arabic masculine given names
Pakistani masculine given names
Turkish masculine given names
Arabic-language surnames